Carucedo is a village and municipality located in the region of El Bierzo (province of León, Castile and León, Spain) . According to the 2010 census (INE), the municipality has a population of 642 inhabitants. 
It is one of Galician speaking councils of Castilla y León.

Notes

Municipalities in El Bierzo